The Jakarta Tourism and Culture Office (JTCO) (Indonesian: Dinas Pariwisata dan Kebudayaan DKI Jakarta is one of the Department of Government of Jakarta. The Jakarta Tourism and Culture Office is responsible for culture and tourism affairs in Jakarta.

History 
Before JTCO was established, the government formed Jakarta Tourism Supervisor Organization (Bapparda Jaya) on February 7, 1967, as the realization of Presidium Decision Ampera Cabinet no. 103/4TAP/2/66.

It was Bapparda Jaya that originated the existence of JTCO. Although administratively JTCO was established on September 20, 1970, however, February 7 has been settled as the commemoration day of Disparbud.

Jakarta as a non-oil sector has vastly developed its tourism potential among the world. It has successfully become the mainstay of foreign exchange and yet influences other cities in Indonesia to improve their tourism potentials. The government originally formed an organization unit that specially handled tourism in Jakarta. Based on Local Regulation (Perda) no. 3/2001, Jakarta Tourism Office was established, whereas Organization Structure and Working Procedure were based on Jakarta Governor Policy no. 107/2001.

With several changes on the bureaucracy on both central and regional levels, the organization structure of the Jakarta government also changed. According to Local Regulation (Perda) no. 10/2008 on Regional Organization, Tourism Office affiliated with Culture and Museum Office becoming Tourism and Cultural Office. In the other hand, Organization Structure and Working Procedure were regulated by Governor Policy no. 107/2009.

Visions, missions, goals 
Visions
 Jakarta Tourism and Culture Office, in doing each and every duty, as the economy executive on tourism sector has visions as follow: “Jakarta as Tourism and Culture Destination with International Standard”
 Lying beneath this vision is the strong will of government of Jakarta, especially Disparbud to make Jakarta equal with other big cities in the world as the widely known tourism and culture destination.

Mission
 Developing sources and products of tourism and culture
 Encouraging the empowerment of people, community, or any tourism and cultural organizations
 Developing the infrastructure of tourism and culture.

Goals
 Increasing the promotion and publicity of tourism and culture
 Actualizing an accountable, effective, and efficient governance execution on tourism and culture.

Main task and function 
According to Local Regulation no. 10/2008 on Regional Organization, main task or function of Jakarta Tourism and Culture Office is “Carrying out tourism matters and regional culture”. To fulfill the main task, Disparbud has functions as follow:

 Preparation and implementation of the work plan and budget the office
 Technical implementation of the policy of tourism and cultural matters
 Enforcement of tourism and culture matters
 Guidance and development of tourism and culture industry
 Empowerment of tourism and cultural community
 Assessment and development of tourism and cultural matters
 Supervision, control, and action on tourism and cultural matters
 Service, guidance, and control of certification recommendation and/or business licensing in tourism and culture area
 Collection, administration, deposit, report, and responsibility of admission fees in tourism and culture area
 Guidance and development of functional power and technical power in tourism and culture area
 Protection, development, and utilization of environment and cultural heritage
 Utilization, preservation, maintenance, and supervision of environment and cultural heritage
 Development of tourism and culture relation on both domestic and foreign
 Execution of tourism and culture service
 Development of tourism destination area
 Promotion and marketing of tourism and culture
 Management of tourism and cultural infrastructures such as National Monument, Ismail Marzuki Park, and Lokasari Folk Entertainment Park
 Establishment of legislation on tourism and culture
 Provision, administration, use, maintenance, and upkeep of tourism and cultural infrastructure
 Technical support to society regional tools; employment, finance, goods, and administration of Tourism and Culture Office
 Report and responsibility on executing duties and functions

Organization structure 
Each field is also divided into several divisions and sub-divions as follow:

1. Head Division

2. Head Deputy Division

3. Secretariat:
 Sub-division of Public
 Sub-division of Employment Affair
 Sub-division of Program and Budget
 Sub-division of Finance
4. Assessment and Development Field
 Product Section
 Market Analysis Section
 Regulation Section
5. Community Empowerment Field
 Community Section
 Institutional Section
 Human Resources Section
6. Destination Attraction Management Field
 Event Attraction Section
 Natural and Artificial Attraction Section
 History and Museum Section
7. Promotion Field
 Domestic Promotion Section
 Overseas Promotion Section
 International Relations Section
8. Tourism Industry Field
 Entertainment and Attraction Section
 Accommodation and Restaurant Section
 Tourism Business Section
9. Infrastructure Field
 Infrastructure Section
 Tool Section
 Environmental Regulation Section
10. Supervision and Control Field
 Tourism and Culture Industry Supervision Section
 Cultural Heritage Supervision Section
 Action Section
11. Tourism Office of Municipalities
 Office Head
 Administration Sub-division
 Tourism Industry Section
 Attraction and Community Empowerment Section
 Monitoring Section
12. Culture Office of Municipalities
 Office Head
 Administration Sub-division
 Community Empowerment Section
 Performance and Exhibition Section
 Infrastructure Section
 Service and Monitoring Section
13. Tourism and Culture Office of Kepulauan Seribu Administrative Regency
 Office Head
 Sub-division of Administration
 Tourism Section
 Culture Section
14. Tourism Office of Sub-district Section

15. Culture Office of Sub-district Section

16. Executor Unit
 Executor Unit of Training Center and Certification of Tourism
 Executor Unit of Development and Tourism Information Service Center
 Executor Unit of Graha Wisata
 Executor Unit of National Monument
 Executor Unit of Jakarta's Anjungan at TMII
 Executor Unit of History Museum
 Executor Unit of Wayang Museum
 Executor Unit of Fine Arts and Ceramics
 Executor Unit of Bahari Museum
 Executor Unit of Textile Museum
 Executor Unit of Joang ’45 Museum
 Executor Unit of Kota Tua Development
 Executor Unit of Conservation Hall
 Executor Unit of Archeology Park Onrust Island
 Executor Unit of BLK Jakarta Pusat
 Executor Unit of BLK Jakarta Utara
 Executor Unit of Jakarta Timur
 Executor Unit of Jakarta Selatan
 Executor Unit of Jakarta Barat
17. Functional Groups

References

Tourism in Indonesia
Government of Indonesia